The London Underground D78 Stock, commonly referred to as D Stock, was a type of sub-surface rolling stock which operated on the District line of the London Underground, except on the Wimbledon to Edgware Road service. The first units were withdrawn in January 2015 with the last withdrawn on 21 April 2017.

History
The D stock was ordered in 1976 to replace the pre-war CO/CP Stock and post-war R Stock on the District line. Seventy-five six-car trains were built by Metro-Cammell, Washwood Heath, the first entering service on 28 January 1980 with last delivered in 1983.

Details

The D Stock consisted of six-car trains, as opposed to the seven-car trains of CO/CP and R Stock, whose cars were shorter: under normal operation, each train consisted of two 3-car units, and 20 of the units are double-ended to allow 3-car operations under exceptional circumstances.

The traction motors were the same LT118 type as on 1973 Tube Stock, and the bogies are same, unlike other subsurface rolling stock. With single-leaf doors and transverse and longitude seating, the style is very similar to 1983 stock on the Jubilee line. The D stock and 1983 stock trains were the only trains on the underground to have their headlights positioned under the train body; many trains on the underground had only their tail lights under the body.

The trains brought many innovations. The Metalastik rubber/metal "Chevron" primary springs and 'diabolo'-shaped rubber/metal secondary springs suspension meant a smoother ride for passengers. The driver's cab is more ergonomic, the seat swiveling to move forwards, backwards, up or down. The dead man's handle is replaced by a joystick that needs to be twisted for the dead man feature, and moved fore and aft for motoring and braking. There is a Train Management System replacing the original Train Equipment Panel that highlights faults to the driver.

The most noticeable difference between the stock and earlier trains is that the doors are single leaf. Originally, passengers pressed door-control buttons to open them. Posters explaining how to operate the doors were put up around Tube stations in English, French and German when the stock was introduced. The stock had a "POGO" switch (Passenger open/Guard's open) that could switch control of the doors from passengers to the guard (when the stock was introduced, the guard controlled the doors from the rear cab).

While this function proved useful at above-ground stations and termini (especially in winter), station dwell time was significantly increased, and passengers had trouble getting used to the new system, not knowing how to open the door. By the late 1990s, the control of the doors went to the driver. The buttons remained, but they were covered up on refurbishment between 2004 and 2008.

The windows had to be modified because of overheating when new, with pull-down opening windows installed in each car.

Usage
The stock was used on the District line, except the High Street Kensington to Edgware Road section, because the platforms are not long enough for D Stock.

Between April 1985 and May 1987, the stock operated the East London line service in three-car formations, there being enough stock spare because of reduced services on the District line. This allowed A60/62 Stock to be sent for One Person Operation (OPO) conversion. The A60/62 stock took over the service again in 1987. The class received the Class 499/0 designation on British Rail's TOPS system to operate on the Richmond and Wimbledon branches.

The stock started being replaced by S Stock in 2016. It was replaced about 15 years short of its intended lifespan, as a consistent new fleet will allow for frequencies to be increased and will reduce maintenance costs.

In July 2011, Harrogate Chamber of Commerce proposed to use the stock on the Harrogate line from York to Leeds via Harrogate to increase capacity. Stations in the Harrogate and Leeds urban areas are close together: the superior acceleration of the stock over the Class 150 diesel multiple units currently used, is intended to cut journey times. It was proposed that the line would be electrified with third rail, similar to the Docklands Light Railway, as opposed to the London Underground or the Southern Region network.

On 24 July 2012, car 7007 was designated as the Olympic 2012 Train with London Underground Chief Operating Officer Howard Collins carrying the Olympic Torch from Wimbledon to Wimbledon Park. This is the only London Underground train to be an Olympic Torch train.

Roster

  - Wheelchair space
 DM - Driving Motor car
 T - Trailer (non-powered) car
 UNDM - Uncoupling Non-Driving Motor car

De-icing equipment was fitted to trailers 17000 to 17048 (evens).

Refurbishment

The mid-life refurbishment was the first to be carried out under the public–private partnership (PPP), by Metronet, and was delayed until contract negotiations were completed. A prototype unit of three cars (7008/17008/8008) was prepared by London Underground's Train Modification Unit at Acton Depot in 2001. This had some detail differences from the eventual refurbishment, and was later brought up to the standard of the rest of the stock. The refurbishment programme began in summer 2005 with the work undertaken by Bombardier Transportation's Derby Litchurch Lane Works. The programme was completed in 2008.

The refurbishment consisted of:
 applying London Underground livery with anti-vandal paint and window film
 restyling the interiors in green and white with silver door painting on the insides instead of orange and also change to the seat moquette.
 replacing maple wood flooring with rubber
 adding buzzers to the doors both when opening and closing
 adding end-of-car windows
 replacing hanging straps (bobbles on springs) with grab bars
 covering the door buttons on exteriors
 adding dot matrix indicators showing the station and destination on the inside and exterior front and sides
 adding an audio passenger information system guided by GPS and odometer, voiced by Emma Clarke: announcements for each station name include connecting lines, and provide warnings to "mind the gap between the train and the platform"
 adding two tip-up seats/disabled multi purpose area
 fitting air conditioning to driver's cab
 fitting CCTV

The refurbished D Stock were the first Underground trains to have electronic dot-matrix information displays on the sides of the cars; some pre-war trains had slot-in or reversible destination or non-stopping plates. It was also the first type in the subsurface fleet to sound buzzers even when the door opens. The rest of the refurbished sub surface stock only had buzzers when the doors closed.

The refurbished D Stock also had the London Underground roundel painted on the sides of all the cars; previously, only the DM cars had the roundel on them.

Around 2014, the emergency cords were fitted with flap coverings as a safety measure so that passengers only pull the cords in case of emergency.

Withdrawal

Withdrawals commenced on 19 January 2015 when the first full 6-car train, formed of units 7510 and 7058, was withdrawn from service at Ealing Common Depot and loaded onto trucks for Long Marston for the driving motors to be converted into 230s and the other cars to be either scrapped or stored for future use. The last train, formed of units 7007 and 7032, ran on 21 April 2017.

A farewell heritage tour took place on 7 May 2017 operated by units 7007+7032.

In February 2016, four redundant D78 cars were used by the emergency services in a mock tube accident staged at Littlebrook Power Station.

One car 7012 is preserved by the London Transport Museum Depot at Acton.

Car 7027 is preserved at Coopers Lane School, Lewisham for use as a library.

Conversion

In 2014 Vivarail purchased 156 driving motor cars and 70 trailer vehicles for conversion to Diesel–electric multiple units. 75 two or three-car units proposed. Under TOPS they are designated as Class 230.

A prototype was produced for testing and accreditation in August 2015, with introduction to service in 2016. The first Class 230 service to carry passengers operated on 19 July 2017 when a unit was used to operate a shuttle service from Honeybourne to the Rail Live exhibition at the Quinton Rail Technology Centre.

The first customer for production Class 230 units was West Midlands Trains, which ordered three two-car DMUs in October 2017. Subsequently Transport for Wales Rail ordered a total of five three-car sets, to be built as bi-mode multiple units (BMMUs), in June 2018.

In September 2019 South Western Railway announced that it would be leasing five two-car Class 484s for use on the upgraded Island Line on the Isle of Wight from 2020. These continue to be powered by electricity drawn from the third rail. The first units arrived on the Isle of Wight on 19 November 2020, and entered service on 1 November 2021 once upgrade works on the island line were completed. While the 484s are considerably taller than the 483s they replaced, a survey of the line prior to the commencement of upgrade works confirmed that the new units would be able to traverse Ryde Tunnel, a requirement for any stock to run on the Island Line.

References

Sources

External links 

 D Stock Tubeprune
 Vivarail

D78
Metropolitan Cammell multiple units
Train-related introductions in 1980